Haines (Tlingit: Deishú) is a census-designated place located in Haines Borough, Alaska, United States. It is in the northern part of the Alaska Panhandle, near Glacier Bay National Park and Preserve.

As of the 2020 census, the population of the Haines CDP was 1,657, down from 1,713 in 2010, concentrating 79.6% of Haines Borough's total population.

History

The original Native name for Haines was Deishú, meaning "end of the trail"  by the Chilkat group of Tlingit. It received this name because they could portage (carry) their canoes from the trail they used to trade with the interior, which began at the outlet of the Chilkat River, to Dtehshuh and save  of rowing around the Chilkat Peninsula.

The first European, George Dickinson, an agent for the North West Trading Company, settled at Dtehshuh in 1879. In 1881, the Chilkat asked Sheldon Jackson to send missionaries to the area. Samuel Hall Young, a Presbyterian minister, was sent. Jackson built the Chilkat Mission and school at Dtehshuh in 1881, on land given to the church by the Chilkat. The Mission was renamed "Haines" in 1884 in honor of Francina E. Haines, the chairwoman of the committee that raised funds for its construction. Haines is the only town in Southeast Alaska to have been named after a woman.

At the time, the boundary between Canada and the U.S. was disputed and vaguely defined. There were overlapping land claims from the United States' purchase of Alaska from Russia in 1867 and British claims along the coast.

The Klondike Gold Rush of 1896–1899 changed the region greatly.  Haines became a supply center for the Dalton Trail from Chilkat Inlet offered a route to the Yukon for prospectors. Gold was also discovered  from Haines in 1899 at the Porcupine District.

The sudden importance of the region increased the urgency of fixing an exact boundary. There were reports that Canadian citizens were harassed by the U.S. as a deterrent to making any land claims. In 1898 the national governments agreed on a compromise, but the government of British Columbia rejected it. U.S. President McKinley proposed a permanent lease of a port near Haines, but Canada rejected that compromise.

The economy continued to grow and diversify. Four canneries were constructed around the mission by 1900. However, the completion of the White Pass and Yukon Route railway in neighboring Skagway that same year led to the Dalton Trail's eventual abandonment and Haines' economic decline.

In 1903, the Hay-Herbert Treaty entrusted the border decision to arbitration by a mixed tribunal of six members, three American and three Canadian–British, who determined in favor of the United States, resulting in the present-day border.

Fort William H. Seward, a United States Army installation, was constructed south of Haines and completed by 1904, on property donated by the mission from its holdings. In 1922, the fort was renamed Chilkoot Barracks. It was the only United States Army post in Alaska before World War II. During World War II, it was used as a supply point for some U.S. Army activities in Alaska. The fort was deactivated in 1946 and sold as surplus property to a group of investors (Ted Gregg, Carl Heinmiller, Marty Cordes, Clarence Mattson, and Steve Homer) who called it "Port Chilkoot", thus forming the Port Chilkoot Company. Port Chilkoot was incorporated as a city in 1956. In 1970, Port Chilkoot merged with Haines into one municipality. Heinmiller was Port Chilkoot's mayor for the majority of its existence as a separate city. In 1972, the fort was designated a National Historic Landmark and the name, Fort William H. Seward, was restored.

Haines was the southern terminal of the Haines-Fairbanks Pipeline (not connected or related to the Trans-Alaska Pipeline System), which provided refined petroleum products to Fort Greely, Eielson Air Force Base, and Ladd Air Force Base (transferred to the Army as Fort Wainwright in 1961). This ,  pipeline carried diesel, automotive gas, jet fuel and aviation gas from Haines to Fairbanks from 1955 until it was retired by the U.S. Army in 1973, due to deterioration and prohibitive repair costs. An Army facility with storage tanks existed alongside the Haines Terminal, which was maintained by the Army for another decade. The construction and maintenance of the terminal and storage facility were a significant factor in the Haines economy for four decades.

All but one of the canneries had closed by 1972 due to declining fish stocks, thus leaving Haines Packing Co. as the sole remaining cannery presently located in Haines. Nonetheless, commercial fishing remains an important part of the local economy. Logging and sawing timber has been an industry around Haines but has declined also in recent years.

In October 2002, voters approved a measure consolidating the city of Haines and Haines Borough into a home rule borough.

Geography and climate
Haines has a dry-summer humid continental climate with warm summers (Köppen: Dsb), although featuring nearly double the precipitation of nearby Skagway.

The CDP is situated on the Chilkat Peninsula at a narrow spot called the Deshu Isthmus. The community is bounded by Portage Cove of Chilkoot Inlet to the east and by the Chilkat River at its mouth into the Chilkat Inlet to the west. To the south, down the Chilkat Peninsula, Haines is bordered by the CDP of Mud Bay, and, to the north, it is bordered by the Lutak CDP.

Alaska Route 7, the Haines Highway, terminates at Haines and leads northwest  to the Canadian border near Pleasant Camp, British Columbia. The Haines Highway continues north to a junction with the Alaska Highway at Haines Junction, Yukon,  from Haines.

During the 21st century, Haines has twice set a local record for snowfall: for the 2006−2007 season it received  of snow, a record broken during the 2011−2012 season, when it received .

Demographics

Haines first appeared on the 1900 U.S. Census as an unincorporated village. It formally incorporated in 1910. It disincorporated in 2002 and became a census-designated place (CDP).

2010 Census

As of the census of 2010, there were 2,474 people and 1,087 households.  The racial makeup of the city was 79.7% White,  10.5% Native American, 1.1% Asian, 0.6% Black or African American, 0.0% Pacific Islander, 7.74% from other races, and 8.2% from two or more races, 3.2% Hispanic or Latino.

The average household size was 2.40 and the average family size was 2.27.

In the city the age distribution of the population shows 26.7% under the age of 18, 5.3% from 18 to 24, 28.0% from 25 to 44, 28.4% from 45 to 64, and 11.6% who were 65 years of age or older.  The median age was 40 years. For every 100 females age 18 and over, there were 99.7 males.

The median income for a household in the city was $39,926, and the median income for a family was $51,316. Males had a median income of $41,103 versus $30,278 for females. The per capita income for the city was $22,505.  About 5.8% of families and 7.9% of the population were below the poverty line, including 9.2% of those under age 18 and 2.4% of those age 65 or over.

Attractions

Many tourists visit during the annual appearance of bald eagles in the Alaska Chilkat Bald Eagle Preserve between October and February. During this time, Haines has the largest concentration of bald eagles in the world. In May, Haines holds Alaska's longest running beer festival, with over 1,500 visitor and breweries from Alaska and Yukon. Haines is the host of the Southeast Alaska State Fair, with four days of festivities on the last weekend of July. Vendors, games, rides, and a music festival bring people from all over Alaska for this event.

The community and surrounding area are popular for outdoor recreation. Rafting in the Chilkat River and hiking in the Takshanuk Mountains (Mount Ripinsky and other peaks) are both popular. Growing winter recreational opportunities are available at and around Chilkat Pass, for which Haines serves as a gateway with the Haines Highway. In recent years, Haines has received increasing attention as a site for heli-skiing. The Davidson Glacier, due to its relatively accessible nature, is also a popular attraction.

Lutak Inlet and Chilkoot Lake are easily accessible and popular fishing sites. Lutak Inlet is frequented by numerous sea lions, seals, and orcas.

Fort William H. Seward is a nationally recognized historic site (declared a National Historic Landmark in 1978), where a number of barracks, officer housing, and parade grounds are maintained, in private ownership today. Some of these structures are open to the public as businesses and restaurants. The fort is also referred to as "Port Chilkoot", a leftover from the Port Chilkoot Company, which was formed after World War II by a group of investors who purchased the fort from the federal government.

Haines has a number of cultural offerings. Alaska Indian Arts offers demonstrations by traditional craftsmen. History of the town of Haines and the local Tlingit people are featured in the Sheldon Museum & Cultural Center. The Hammer Museum is dedicated to the history of the hammer in human society. The Tsirku Canning Company Museum offers a glimpse of Haines' historic salmon canneries. The American Bald Eagle Foundation offers visitors a chance to tour the Natural History Museum, full of items from Southeast Alaska, and meet 9 raptor ambassadors. The ambassadors include 3 bald eagles (Bella, Arden, and Vega), 2 red-tailed hawks (Sitka and Warrior), 1 Eurasian eagle owl (Hans), 1 Eastern screech owl (Dylan), 1 Northern hawk owl (Cirrus), and 1 Peregrin falcon (Ole).

Haines is the location for the Southeast Alaskan State Fair, held annually each July. Among other attractions, the fairgrounds incorporate a portion of the set from Walt Disney's White Fang film, filmed in Haines in 1990. The surviving set includes a dozen small structures common to a mining town of the period of Jack London's book of the same name.

Tourists also visit annually on cruise ships.

Education
Haines is home to the Haines Borough Public Library and the Haines Borough School District, which consists of a K-12 and three divisions in a single building:
Haines Elementary (K-6)
Haines Middle/High School (7-12)
The Haines Home School is also in operation.

As of October 2018, the District's student enrollment was 258.

Transportation

Haines is more accessible than most other southeast Alaskan communities of its size, as it is connected to the North American highway system by the Haines Highway, which passes through British Columbia on its way to the junction with the Alaska Highway at Haines Junction, Yukon. However, snow and ice conditions in the winter and the long driving times can often make this route less feasible, and at times results in closure of the portion of the highway in the Chilkat Pass, just north of the Canada–US border. Haines is one of only three cities in southeast Alaska which are accessible by road to another city, the other two being Skagway and Hyder.

The primary mode of intra-Alaskan transportation is by the Alaska Marine Highway. The Lynn Canal route of the ferry system (Juneau-Haines-Skagway) is the only profitable route in the entire system and often receives a large amount of ferry traffic, especially in the summer.

The Haines Airport receives a large amount of traffic, with three bush carriers (Alaska Seaplanes, Wings of Alaska and Harris Aircraft Services) providing services to Gustavus, Skagway, Sitka, and Juneau.

Recently, Haines became a port-of-call to several cruise ship operators, including Princess Cruises and the Holland-America Line. As of summer 2009, the cruise ship visiting frequency is about 18 per season, according to local residents. Between 2010 and 2012, an average of 30,000 cruise ship passengers visited annually. The cruise ship berth is very near Fort William H. Seward.

Health care
Haines is served by Haines Health Center, the only primary health clinic in the area. The facility is part of the Southeast Alaska Regional Health Consortium, or SEARHC, a non-profit tribal health consortium of 18 Native communities. The area is also served continuously by local emergency medical services. Individuals in need of dire medical attention are transported by air via helicopter or air ambulance to Bartlett Regional Hospital in Juneau (approximately 35 minutes away by plane). Whitehorse General Hospital in Whitehorse, Yukon is the nearest hospital to Haines that is accessible by road (approximately 4.5 hours away).

The difficulties in accessing health care for rural dwellers in general were examined in a short black-and-white documentary set and filmed in and around Haines in 1956, documenting and dramatizing a stop on the travels of a public health nurse and doctor (both female) aboard a travelling clinic boat, Hygiene.  According to the voiceover narration, the film was cast with local non-actors.

Media
Haines is served by a weekly newspaper, the Chilkat Valley News, as well as the public radio station KHNS which serves upper Lynn Canal (Haines, Skagway, and Klukwan) although its primary studios are located in Haines. Haines also receives circulation of the free regional newspaper Capital City Weekly.

In popular culture
At the conclusion of El Camino, the 2019 film sequel to the series Breaking Bad, Jesse Pinkman obtains a new identity, escapes Albuquerque, New Mexico, and relocates to Haines.

Notable people 

 Florence Shotridge, Tlingit ethnographer, museum educator, and weaver
 Jennie Thlunaut, Tlingit master weaver
 Bill Thomas, commercial fisherman and former member of the Alaska House of Representatives

References

External links

 
 Haines Chamber of Commerce
Haines Convention and Visitors Bureau
 Haines Borough official website
 American Legion Lynn Canal Post 12 from Haines

Borough seats in Alaska
Census-designated places in Alaska
Former cities in Alaska
Populated coastal places in Alaska on the Pacific Ocean
Census-designated places in Haines Borough, Alaska